Polygonum californicum is a species of flowering plant in the buckwheat family known by the common name California knotweed. It is native to the west coast of the United States from Washington, Oregon, and northern and central California in the Coast Ranges and Sierra Nevada foothills as far south as Napa and Tulare Counties. It can be found in many types of open habitats.

Description
Polygonum californicum is an annual herb producing a slender, angled stem which grows erect to a maximum height near 40 centimeters. The narrow, pointed leaves are mostly located on upper branches of the stem. The leaves have fringed, bristle-tipped stipules attached to their bases. Solitary white or pink flowers occur in upper leaf axils.

References

External links
Jepson Manual Treatment - Polygonum californicum
Polygonum californicum - Calphotos Photo gallery, University of California

californicum
Endemic flora of the United States
Flora of the West Coast of the United States
Flora of California
Natural history of the California chaparral and woodlands
Plants described in 1856
Taxa named by Carl Meissner
Flora without expected TNC conservation status